Nam Duck-woo (22 April 1924 – 18 May 2013) was the 12th Prime Minister of South Korea from 1980 to 1982.

Nam received his PhD in economics from Oklahoma State University. He served as finance minister from 1969 to 1974 under the Presidency of Park Chung-hee. He was appointed as Deputy Prime Minister of South Korea in 1974 and served in this position till 1978. Under President Chun Doo-hwan, Nam was the prime minister from 1980 to 1982.

Nam served as the International Chair of the Pacific Economic Cooperation Council (PECC) from 1983 to 1985.

Death
On May 18, 2013, Duck-woo died of testicular cancer at the age of 89.

See also
Prime Minister of South Korea
List of prime ministers of South Korea

References

1924 births
2013 deaths
Prime Ministers of South Korea
Finance ministers of South Korea
Deputy Prime Ministers of South Korea
Oklahoma State University alumni
Academic staff of Sogang University
Deaths from cancer in South Korea
Deaths from testicular cancer
Uiryeong Nam clan
Seoul National University alumni
Kookmin University alumni